Mario Maraschi (28 August 1939 – 3 December 2020) was an Italian professional footballer and manager who played as a striker.

In 2018, he was inducted into ACF Fiorentina Hall of Fame.

Career
In his  youth, Maraschi played for Fanfulla, with which he also debuted in the 1956–57 IV Serie season.

After two seasons at Pro Vercelli, he was bought by Milan, where he made his debut in Serie A.

After brief spells at Lazio, Bologna, and Lanerossi Vicenza, he moved to Fiorentina in 1967. Here, he contributed to winning the 1968–69 Serie A, scoring 14 goals.

In 1969, he debuted in a European competition, playing in the 1969–70 European Cup against Östers IF and scoring the winning goal.

Honours

Player

Club
Fiorentina
Serie A: 1968–69

Individual 
ACF Fiorentina Hall of Fame: 2018

References

External links
 Mario Maraschi at Enciclopediadelcalcio.it
 
 

1939 births
2020 deaths
Italian footballers
Association football forwards
ACF Fiorentina players
A.C. Milan players
S.S. Lazio players
Bologna F.C. 1909 players
Cagliari Calcio players
U.C. Sampdoria players
A.S.D. Fanfulla players
Italian football managers
FC Chiasso managers
Italian expatriate football managers
Expatriate football managers in Switzerland
Italian expatriate sportspeople in Switzerland